Vermunden is a lake in Åsnes Municipality in Innlandet county, Norway. The small village of Vermundsjøen lies at the north end of the lake, where Åsnes Finnskog Church is located.

See also
List of lakes in Norway

References

Åsnes
Lakes of Innlandet